Chernihiv Raion  is a raion (district) of Chernihiv Oblast, northern Ukraine. Its administrative centre is the city of Chernihiv. Population: 

On 18 July 2020, as part of the administrative reform of Ukraine, the number of raions of Chernihiv Oblast was reduced to five, and the area of Chernihiv Raion was significantly expanded. Four abolished raions, Horodnia, Kozelets, Kulykivka, and Ripky Raions, as well as part of Mena Raion and the city of Chernihiv, which was previously incorporated as a city of oblast significance and did not belong to the raion, were merged into Chernihiv Raion. The January 2020 estimate of the raion population was

Subdivisions

Current
After the reform in July 2020, the raion consisted of 20 hromadas:
 Berezna settlement hromada with the administration in the urban-type settlement of Berezna, transferred from Mena Raion;
 Chernihiv urban hromada with the administration in the city of Chernihiv, was previously a city of oblast significance;
 Desna settlement hromada with the administration in the urban-type settlement of Desna, transferred from Kozelets Raion;
 Dobrianka settlement hromada with the administration in the urban-type settlement of Dobrianka, transferred from Ripky Raion;
 Honcharivske settlement hromada with the administration in the urban-type settlement of Honcharivske, retained from Chernihiv Raion;
 Horodnia urban hromada with the administration in the city of Horodnia, transferred from Horodnia Raion;
 Ivanivka rural hromada with the administration in the selo of Ivanivka, retained from Chernihiv Raion;
 Kipti rural hromada with the administration in the selo of Kipti, transferred from Kozelets Raion;
 Kozelets settlement hromada with the administration in the urban-type settlement of Kozelets, transferred from Kozelets Raion;
 Kulykivka settlement hromada with the administration in the urban-type settlement of Kulykivka, transferred from Kulykivka Raion;
 Kyinka rural hromada with the administration in the selo of Kyinka, retained from Chernihiv Raion;
 Kyselivka rural hromada with the administration in the selo of Kyselivka, retained from Chernihiv Raion;
 Liubech settlement hromada with the administration in the urban-type settlement of Liubech, transferred from Ripky Raion;
 Mykhailo-Kotsiubynske settlement hromada with the administration in the urban-type settlement of Mykhailo-Kotsiubynske, retained from Chernihiv Raion;
 Novyi Bilous rural hromada with the administration in the selo of Novyi Bilous, retained from Chernihiv Raion;
 Olyshivka settlement hromada with the administration in the urban-type settlement of Olyshivka, retained from Chernihiv Raion;
 Oster urban hromada with the administration in the city of Oster, transferred from Kozelets Raion;
 Ripky settlement hromada with the administration in the urban-type settlement of Ripky, transferred from Ripky Raion;
 Sedniv settlement hromada, with the administration in the urban-type settlement of Sedniv, retained from Chernihiv Raion;
 Tupychiv rural hromada with the administration in the selo of Tupychiv, transferred from Horodnia Raion.

Before 2020

Before the 2020 reform, the raion consisted of eight hromadas:
 Honcharivske settlement hromada with the administration in Honcharivske;
 Ivanivka rural hromada with the administration in Ivanivka;
 Kyinka rural hromada with the administration in Kyinka;
 Kyselivka rural hromada with the administration in Kyselivka;
 Mykhailo-Kotsiubynske settlement hromada with the administration in Mykhailo-Kotsiubynske;
 Novyi Bilous rural hromada with the administration in Novyi Bilous;
 Olyshivka settlement hromada with the administration in Olyshivka;
 Sedniv settlement hromada with the administration in Sedniv.

See also 
Chernihiv–Ovruch railway

References

External links 

Raions of Chernihiv Oblast
1923 establishments in Ukraine